is a Japanese television drama series based on the Mizuki Tsujimura's novel. It premiered on NHK on January 10, 2012, starring Yūka in the lead role.

Cast
 Yūka as Takako Yamai
 Yuko Asano as Kaoruko Sugiura
 Ken Ishiguro as Tsuyoshi Yamamoto
 Tomoka Kurokawa as Narumi Asahi
 Mitsuki Tanimura as Himika Kagayama/Marika Kagayama
 Mari Hoshino as Reina Ōsaki
 Naoki Tanaka as Junichi Tokura
 Yoshinori Okada as Rikuo Suzuki
 Miho Shiraishi as Kiwako Suzuki
 Seishiro Kato as Masora Shirasu
 Yasuo Daichi as Junichirō Iwakura
 Mai Oshima as Asuka Mita

References

External links
 Official website 
 

2012 in Japanese television
2012 Japanese television series debuts
2012 Japanese television series endings
Japanese drama television series
NHK original programming
Television shows written by Yumie Nishiogi
Television shows based on Japanese novels